The Men's super-G competition at the 2017 World Championships was held on 8 February 2017.

Results
The race was started at 12:00.

References

Men's super-G